The Sese Coal Mine is a coal mine located in Central District. The mine has coal reserves amounting to 2.73 billion tonnes of coking coal, one of the largest coal reserves in Africa and the world.

See also 
List of mines in Botswana

References 

Coal mines in Botswana